Isaac Pendleton Langworthy (January 19, 1806 – January 5, 1888) was an American Congregational minister.

Langworthy was born in (North) Stonington, Connecticut,  January 19, 1806, the son of John and Sarah (Pendleton) Langworthy.  After some early experience in school-teaching and in business, he studied medicine, taking one course of lectures at the Medical School of Harvard University, and settled in practice in his native town at the age of 25.  He was active in Christian labors, and was soon convinced, during a very general revival of religion in his neighborhood, of his duty to preach the gospel.  Accordingly, at the age of 27 he began to prepare for College, supporting himself meantime by his medical practice and by teaching music.   He graduated from Yale College in 1839.  After graduation, he spent two years in the Yale Divinity School, going thence to Chelsea, Mass., where he gathered a new Congregational church, of which he was ordained pastor, November 10, 1841. He resigned this position on the seventeenth anniversary of his settlement.  His residence continued in Chelsea until his death.

Shortly before his withdrawal from the pastorate he had accepted the position of Corresponding Secretary of the American Congregational Union, in Boston, with the main work of aiding in building churches and parsonages for missionary congregations.  He proved equally successful in the self-denying labors of his new field, but after ten years, in 1867, he exchanged this duty for a corresponding relation to the American Congregational Association, and devoted himself thenceforth with unremitting zeal to the congenial task of securing and enlarging a Congregational House and Library, in Boston. These efforts were crowned with remarkable success, and at his retirement from active service in 1887 he could point to a suitable building occupied as a denominational house, and to a very valuable library which had been increased by gifts procured through his efforts from some 3500 to over 33,000 volumes.

After a short period of feeble health, followed by a few weeks of more rapid failure, he died in Chelsea, on January 5, 1888, at the age of 82.

He married, on August 8, 1842, Sarah, daughter of Cyrus Williams, of New Haven. His children, three sons and a daughter, died before him.

Langworthy received the honorary degree of Doctor of Divinity from Iowa College in 1878.

References

External links

1806 births
1888 deaths
American Congregationalist ministers
American librarians
People from Stonington, Connecticut
Harvard Medical School alumni
Physicians from Connecticut
Yale Divinity School alumni
Yale College alumni
19th-century American clergy